Codeine is an opiate substance.

Codeine also may refer to:

 Codeine (band), American rock band (1989-1994, 2012)
 Codeine, KDE Dragon [video] Player
 "Cod'ine", song written by Buffy Sainte-Marie

See also
 Codeine methylbromide, a chemical derivative of codeine
 Codeine Velvet Club, a Scottish rock band
 Cocaine, another (but non-opiate) substance, sometimes described as a “drug”, a "narcotic" or "a narcotic" and also having songs named for it